Manfred "Manni" Burgsmüller (22 December 1949 – 18 May 2019) was a German professional footballer who played mainly as a striker; he also occasionally operated as a midfielder.

He appeared in 447 Bundesliga games over the course of 17 seasons, mainly for Borussia Dortmund and Werder Bremen, scoring 213 goals. After retiring professionally in his 40s, he played as a kicker in American football.

Football career
During his early career, Burgsmüller played in two different spells for local Rot-Weiss Essen and Bayer Uerdingen alike. In his first stint with the latter club, in the regional leagues, he scored 29 goals in two separate seasons, followed by 22. After failing to score initially for Essen, he returned in 1974 and netted an average of 16 per year.

In October 1976, Burgsmüller left Uerdingen for Borussia Dortmund. At Dortmund, he fielded almost exclusively as a midfielder, but also had the most productive years of his career individually there, never netting fewer than 15 goals in the Bundesliga). In the 1980–81 campaign, he scored a career-best – in division one – 27 goals, helping the North Rhine-Westphalia side finish in seventh position, and ranking second in the goalscorers' chart, just two behind Karl-Heinz Rummenigge who played for champions FC Bayern Munich.

After one sole season with 1. FC Nürnberg, Burgsmüller moved to the second level with Rot-Weiß Oberhausen. In his first year, he was crucial as the team narrowly avoided relegation, scoring 29 times and being crowned Torjäger, with 12 goals more than the next player.

Burgsmüller started the next season in scoring fashion, netting seven times in only 15 matches. In November 1985, at nearly 36, he returned to the first division, signing for SV Werder Bremen where he would achieve team success: he scored in his first game, a 2–1 win at Borussia Mönchengladbach, adding two in his third, a 6–0 home routing of VfB Stuttgart, and totalling 13 in only 20 matches for the campaign, as Werder finished second; during his spell, the veteran appeared in 115 league games with 34 goals, being an important attacking element in the conquest of the 1988 league title.

On 11 October 1988, Burgsmüller scored the fourth goal in Werder Bremen's 5–0 victory against BFC Dynamo in the first round of the 1988–89 European Cup, becoming the oldest player to score a goal in the history of the competition at the age of 38 years and 293 days.

Burgsmüller retired at almost 41, also having appeared three times for West Germany, in friendlies comprised in a three-month span. His debut came on 16 November 1977, in a 4–1 win with Switzerland.

After football
Burgsmüller made a comeback in NFL Europe in 1996, being Rhein Fire's kicker from 1996 to 2002, becoming the oldest professional American football player in history, at age 52. He also won two World Bowls, in 1998 and 2000.

Burgsmüller died on 18 May 2019 in Essen. 

On 1 August 2019 fans of the Essen-born player led by British football writer, also president of Borussia Dortmund's London supporters club, Ben McFadyean organized a testimonial football match at VFL Kemminghausen, a seventh-tier (Landesliga) football club in Dortmund. Players that took part in the match included former colleagues including Frank Mill, Michael Lusch, and Marcel Raducanu. KFC Uerdingen defender Kevin Grosskreutz and assistant coach of Bayern München Hermann Gerland also took part. The match which was attended by 2,000 spectators, including Nadine and Corrina two of the player's three daughters, raised €15,000 for Kinderlachen children's charity.

Career statistics

Club

International

Honours
Werder Bremen
 Bundesliga: 1987–88
 DFB-Pokal: runner-up 1988–89, 1989–90
 DFL-Supercup: 1988

Rhein Fire
 NFL Europe: 1998, 2000

References

External links

1949 births
2019 deaths
Footballers from Essen
German footballers
Association football midfielders
Association football forwards
Bundesliga players
2. Bundesliga players
Rot-Weiss Essen players
KFC Uerdingen 05 players
Borussia Dortmund players
1. FC Nürnberg players
Rot-Weiß Oberhausen players
SV Werder Bremen players
Germany international footballers
Germany B international footballers
German players of American football
Rhein Fire players
Footballers who switched code
American football placekickers
West German footballers